John Eggen (15 June 1885 – ??) was a Norwegian politician for the Labour Party.

He was born at Eggen in Elverum as a son of smallholders. After finishing primary education, he worked as a forest and construction worker until 1915, then as a supervisor in the Norwegian Public Roads Administration.

In 1925 he was elected to the executive committee of Våler municipal council. He served as mayor from 1931 to 1940, when he was removed during the occupation of Norway by Nazi Germany. He also lost his place as chairman of the school board, which he had become in 1931. From 1945 to 1947, he was again an executive committee member. He served as a deputy representative to the Parliament of Norway from Hedmark during the term 1931–1933. He met in the place of Olav Sæter in parliamentary session in April 1932 and May 1933.

References

1885 births
Year of death missing
Labour Party (Norway) politicians
Deputy members of the Storting
Mayors of places in Hedmark
People from Elverum
Date of death unknown